Nutanix, Inc. is an American cloud computing company that sells software, cloud services (such as desktops as a service, disaster recovery as a service, and cloud monitoring), and software-defined storage.

History
Nutanix was founded on September 23, 2009 by Dheeraj Pandey, Mohit Aron and Ajeet Singh. In early 2013 Aron left Nutanix to start Cohesity,  a privately held computer data storage company.

Venture capital firms invested $312.2 million over five rounds of funding in Nutanix. The company reached a $1 billion valuation by 2013, which made it known as a "unicorn startup". It raised $140 million in a Series E round of financing in 2014, valuing the company at approximately $2 billion.
Nutanix's backers included Lightspeed Venture Partners, Khosla Ventures, and Blumberg Capital.

Nutanix filed for an initial public offering (IPO) in December 2015, reporting a net loss in its fiscal year ending July 2015 of $126 million. In August 2016, Nutanix announced it had acquired PernixData.

The IPO on September 30, 2016, raised about $230 million after selling 14.87 million shares at a price of $16. This was the biggest VC-backed IPO of 2016 in the U.S. Analysts expected Nutanix's public offering would be delayed.

In May 2017, Nutanix partnered with IBM to create a series of data center hardware using IBM Power Systems for business apps.

In March 2018, Nutanix announced the acquisition of Minjar, based in Bangalore. Later the same year, Nutanix acquired the DaaS startup Frame.

On June 1, 2019, Nutanix appointed Brian Stevens to its board of directors. In March 2020, Sohaib Abbasi joined the company's board of directors.

Due to the COVID-19 pandemic, Nutanix announced a furlough impacting about 1,500 employees in April 2020. In June 2020, Nutanix added Virginia Gambale to its board of directors.

In December, 2020, Pandey was replaced as chief executive by Rajiv Ramaswami, who had been the chief operating officer at VMware.
VMware filed a lawsuit, alleging a conflict of interest, but dropped the legal fight a year later.

In 2021, the company transitioned from making hardware appliances to focusing on subscription software.

In 2022, MinIO alleged that Nutanix had been violating MinIO's free software license for the past three years, with good faith negotiations over the matter breaking down and Nutanix' license being revoked as a consequence.

Acquisitions

Operations
Nutanix combines storage, computing, and virtualization. The company's software product families include Acropolis, Prism, Era, Frame, and Files. In 2015, Nutanix was reported to have built a Linux KVM based hypervisor, called AHV (Acropolis HyperVisor) in order to make managing computer infrastructure easier.

Nutanix marketed its products as "hyper-converged infrastructure".
In 2020, the company shifted to a subscription business model.

See also
 Harvester (HCI)

References

Software companies established in 2009
Cloud infrastructure
Companies listed on the Nasdaq
2016 initial public offerings
2009 establishments in California